Harvey Friedman (born 1959), sometimes credited as Harvey Friedmann, is an American film,  television and theatre actor.

Early life and education
He was born in Pittsburgh, Pennsylvania, and studied drama at Carnegie-Mellon University in Pittsburgh.

Career
Friedman began his acting career in the theatre.  He toured Germany with a theater company and settled in Berlin, Germany.

He has appeared on German television and in international co-productions since the 1980s and played Dr. Joseph Goebbels in the film Valkyrie (2008), directed by Bryan Singer.

Partial film and television work

1988: Midnight Cop
1989: Fool's Mate
1990: The Being from Earth
1997: 
1997: Meschugge
1999: How Norman Mailer Stabbed His Wife in the Breast
2001: My Sweet Home
2002: Berlin Beshert
2003: Hitler: The Rise of Evil, television miniseries
2004: [[Beyond the Sea (2004 film)|Beyond the Sea]]2008: Speed Racer2008: Valkyrie2009: 2013: 2013: The Voices2015: Sense82015: Die Akte General2015: Stefan Zweig: Farewell to Europe2017: Submergence2018: Murer – Anatomie eines Prozesses2020: Unorthodox''

Personal life
After settling in Germany, Friedman married Cynthia Barcomi, an American coffee-roaster and cookbook author.

References

External links

1959 births
American emigrants to Germany
American male film actors
American male stage actors
American male television actors
Living people
Male actors from Pittsburgh
Carnegie Mellon University College of Fine Arts alumni